Satiana is a village in Jhang District in the Punjab province of Pakistan.  Nearby towns are kheiewa and Nikka Daultana. It is connected by  road to Chiniot, Rajabad and Mundwali.

References 
 

Populated places in Jhang District